Silk is a technology company headquartered in Needham, Massachusetts, United States. Silk offers a cloud platform for enterprise customers with mission-critical applications. The company has offices in Boston and Israel.

History

CEO, Dani Golan, founded Silk in 2008. Originally called Kaminario, after the Japanese god of lightning, the company was a flash storage start-up.
 
The company's first venture capital funding round was announced in May 2011 with a $15 million investment from Globespan Capital Partners, Sequoia Capital, and Pitango Venture Capital. Silk received $25 million in series D funding in June 2012 from Tenaya Capital and existing investors. In December 2014 and January 2015, the company announced $68 million in a series E round from Lazarus Hedge Fund, Silicon Valley Bank, Mitsui & Co. Global Investment, and existing investors.

In 2017, the company evolved to focus purely on storage software in a Storage as a Service model. It partnered with Tech Data to offer customers inexpensive hardware to run their storage software on.

In 2020, the company rebranded itself as Silk.

Products 

The Silk Platform is a virtualized data layer that sits between customers’ cloud infrastructure and databases/workloads. The Silk Platform decouples data from the cloud infrastructure, so workloads can be moved from one cloud vendor to another, to the private cloud, or to on-premises. Silk's Tier 1 data services include zero-footprint clones, data replication, deduplication, and thin provisioning to minimize the cloud resources being used.

The Silk Platform is built on auto-scalable and symmetric active-active architecture that delivers performance across any workload profile, leveraging cloud native IaaS components. With the Silk Clarity capability, the platform uses machine-learning analytics to optimize resources. Silk Flex makes it possible to orchestrate and automate data management.

References

External links
 

Cloud computing
Cloud databases
Cloud storage
Companies based in Massachusetts
Information technology companies of Israel